The Football Federation of Burundi is the governing body of football in Burundi. It was founded in 1962, affiliated to FIFA in 1972 and to CAF in 1972. It organizes the national football league and the national team.

References

External links
 Burundi at the FIFA website.
   Burundi at CAF Online

Burundi
Football in Burundi
Sports organizations established in 1948